Adam Payerl (born March 4, 1991) is a Canadian professional ice hockey forward. He is currently playing with the Augsburger Panther of the Deutsche Eishockey Liga (DEL). He has previously played with the Pittsburgh Penguins in the National Hockey League (NHL).

Playing career
Payerl played four seasons (2007–2011) of major junior hockey in the Ontario Hockey League (OHL), scoring 60 goals and 83 assists for 143 points, while earning 303 penalty minutes, in 306 OHL games played.

On March 1, 2012, the Pittsburgh Penguins of the National Hockey League (NHL) signed Payerl as an undrafted free agent to a three-year entry-level contract, and he made his professional debut with their AHL affiliate, the Wilkes-Barre/Scranton Penguins.

On April 6, 2014, Payerl made his NHL debut with the Penguins playing against the Colorado Avalanche.

Following the completion of his entry-level contract with the Penguins, and having suffered from injury in his final year with AHL affiliate in Wilkes-Barre, Payerl was not tendered a qualifying offer and was released to free agency. He went un-signed over the summer before belatedly signing a contract in the ECHL with the Cincinnati Cyclones on September 11, 2015. Prior to the beginning of the 2015–16 season with the Cyclones, Payerl was signed to a try-out contract to attend the Milwaukee Admirals training camp on September 29, 2015. He featured in 8 games with the Admirals, impressing with 4 points to be released from his try-out and signed to an AHL contract for the remainder of the season on November 11, 2015. Upon completing the season with the Admirals and posting a career high 29 points, Payerl was signed to a one-year, two-way contract with parent affiliate, the Nashville Predators on April 21, 2016.

On September 24, 2017, Payerl as a free agent was announced to have signed a one-year AHL deal with the Providence Bruins. In his lone season with Providence in 2017–18, Payerl was limited to 44 games through injury, posting 9 goals and 17 points.

In the following off-season, Payerl agreed to his first contract abroad in signing a one-year deal with German outfit, Augsburger Panther of the DEL, on May 17, 2018.

Career statistics

References

External links

1991 births
Living people
Augsburger Panther players
Barrie Colts players
Belleville Bulls players
Canadian ice hockey centres
Milwaukee Admirals players
Ice hockey people from Ontario
Sportspeople from Kitchener, Ontario
Pittsburgh Penguins players
Providence Bruins players
Undrafted National Hockey League players
Wheeling Nailers players
Wilkes-Barre/Scranton Penguins players
Canadian expatriate ice hockey players in Germany